New Jersey's 5th Legislative District is one of 40 in the New Jersey Legislature. As of the 2011 apportionment, the district covers the Camden County municipalities of Audubon, Audubon Park, Barrington, Bellmawr, Brooklawn, Camden, Gloucester City, Haddon Heights, Lawnside, Magnolia, Mount Ephraim, Runnemede and Woodlynne; and the Gloucester County municipalities of Deptford Township, Harrison Township, Mantua Township, Wenonah, Westville and Woodbury.

Demographic characteristics
As of the 2020 United States census, the district had a population of 221,612, of whom 168,945 (76.2%) were of voting age. The racial makeup of the district was 119,934 (54.1%) White, 45,434 (20.5%) African American, 1,208 (0.5%) Native American, 6,686 (3.0%) Asian, 87 (0.0%) Pacific Islander, 29,335 (13.2%) from some other race, and 18,928 (8.5%) from two or more races. Hispanic or Latino of any race were 51,605 (23.0%) of the population.

The district had 163,507 registered voters as of December 1, 2021, of whom 59,177 (36.2%) were registered as unaffiliated, 75,237 (46.0%) were registered as Democrats, 26,512 (16.2%) were registered as Republicans, and 2,581 (1.6%) were registered to other parties.

Political representation
For the 2022–2023 session, the district is represented in the State Senate by Nilsa Cruz-Perez (D, Barrington) and in the General Assembly by Bill Moen (D, Camden) and William Spearman (D, Camden).

The legislative districts are divided evenly based on what overlaps with  New Jersey's 1st and 2nd congressional districts.

1965–1973
The 1964 Supreme Court decision in Reynolds v. Sims required legislative districts' populations be equal as possible. As an interim measure, the 5th District in the 1965 State Senate election encompassed all of Ocean and Monmouth counties which elected two members of the Senate at-large. Republicans Richard R. Stout and William T. Hiering won this election for a two-year term. For the 1967 and 1971 elections, the 5th consisted of only Monmouth County and elected two and three Senators respectively. Republicans Stout and Alfred N. Beadleston won the 1967 election for a four-year term while Stout, Beadleston, and Republican Assemblyman Joseph Azzolina won in the 1971 election for a two-year term.

Between 1967 and 1973, the 5th Senate District was split into two Assembly districts, each electing two members. As Monmouth County gained population following the 1970 Census, an additional Assembly member was elected at-large for the 1971 election. The members elected to the Assembly from each district are as follows:

District composition since 1973
Since the creation of the 40-district legislative map in 1973, the 5th District has always been based around the city of Camden and nearby suburbs. In the 1973 iteration of the map, the district began in Camden city and traveled southeast to Hi-Nella. In 1981, some Camden County boroughs and Haddon Township were removed but added to the district were Gloucester City, Bellmawr, and Runnemede in Camden County and Deptford Township and Woodbury Heights. No major changes were made to the district in the 1991 or 2001 reapportionments. The 2011 apportionment added Audubon Park (from the 6th District) and Harrison Township, Mantua Township and Wenonah (all from the 3rd District). Municipalities that had been in the 4th District as part of the 2001 apportionment that were shifted out of the district as of 2011 are Woodbury Heights (to the 3rd District), and Hi-Nella, Somerdale and Stratford (all to the 6th District).

The territory currently in the 5th has been in Democratic hands without interruption since 1973.  Indeed, the 5th is one of the few districts in the state to have ever elected only one party to all Senate and Assembly seats in every election since 1973.

Assemblyman Arthur Barclay resigned his seat on June 19, 2018, citing health reasons. His resignation came less than two weeks following him being arrested for simple assault at his home. Democratic committee members in Camden and Gloucester Counties selected former Camden City Councilman William Spearman as his replacement in the Assembly on June 27; he was sworn in on June 30.

Election history

Election results, 1973–present

Senate

General Assembly

Election results, 1965–1973

Senate

General Assembly

District 5A

District 5B

District 5 At-large

References

Camden County, New Jersey
Gloucester County, New Jersey
05